Michelle "Shelly" Jenneke (born 23 June 1993) is an Australian hurdler and model. She won a silver medal for the 100 m hurdles at the 2010 Summer Youth Olympics and the 100 m hurdles at the 2016 Australian Athletics Championships to qualify for the Rio Olympic Games. In 2012, she received worldwide media attention after her pre-race warm-up dance went viral on the internet and was featured in the 2013 Sports Illustrated Swimsuit Issue.

Early life and education 
Born in Kenthurst, New South Wales, Australia, she attended The Hills Grammar School.

She studied mechatronics at Sydney University, a combination of mechanical and electric engineering. In an interview, she described her hobbies as Australian rules football, soccer, quad biking, climbing trees, and handball.

Career 
Jenneke has trained with coach Mick Zisti as a hurdler from the age of 10 at the Cherrybrook Athletics Club. She competed at the Canberra-hosted 2008 Pacific School Games in the 90 and 200 metres hurdles.

In March 2010, Jenneke finished first in the 100 m hurdles, breaking the national record in the women's sprint medley relay at the 2010 Australian Junior Championships. She competed in the 2011 Pirtek Athletic Allstars event. In July of that year, she was on Australia's team at the 2010 Singapore Youth Olympic Games, running the 100 m hurdles and the women's medley relay. In the hurdles, she came second with a time of 13.46 and set a personal best after winning her heat, and the medley relay team came fourth. Her medal was the first Australia won at the Games in athletics.

In 2011, Jenneke competed at the New Zealand hosted Cooks Classic. At the 2011 Australian Junior Championships, she had a first-place hurdles finish in the under-20 group. In April 2011 she competed at the 89th Australian Athletics Championships and finished third in the 100 m hurdles behind world champion Sally Pearson.

On 15 July 2012, Jenneke finished fifth in the 2012 IAAF World Junior Championships 100 m hurdles. After the competition, a video of her 100 m hurdles taken during the heats race, was subsequently posted on a video-sharing site, raising her profile around the world.

She was selected as a member of Australia's 2014 Commonwealth Games team. There Jenneke came fifth in the final with a time of 13.36 and was the youngest competitor. She is the second-fastest 100 metre hurdle woman in Australian history.

Jenneke's personal best is 12.66 set at the 2022 World Athletics Championships in Oregon , in the same heat that saw the world record fall to Tobi Amusan. She finished second at nationals to qualify for the 2015 World Championships in Beijing. Jenneke got through the heats to make the semi-finals. She finished sixth in her semi and in 18th place overall.

In March 2016, Jenneke represented Australia at the World Indoor Championships in Portland, Oregon and finished 10th. The next month she won the Australian National Championship 100 m hurdles final with a time of 12.93, qualifying her for the 2016 Summer Olympics in Rio de Janeiro. In August, Jenneke competed in the Olympics but was unable to get out of the heats, finishing in sixth with a time of 13.26. She would have needed a near personal best to qualify as the third qualifying time in her heat was 12.85. Australian head coach Craig Hilliard was critical of her performance.

In the Australian University Games at Perth Jenneke tried her hand at the 100 metres sprint, getting through to the final, and the long jump where she finished second with a distance of 5.61 metres and her own event the 110 metres hurdles, which she won with a time of 14.19 seconds.

In August 2017, Jenneke competed in her second World Championships and got through the heats to the semi-finals, finishing in 7th with a time of 13.250. She would have needed a near personal best to reach the final as the second qualifying time in her semi was 12.85. In the BBC's montage of events (the moments of the games as BBC presenter Gabby Logan called it) on the games' final evening Jenneke and her warm up jig was featured.

In April 2018, she represented Australia at the Commonwealth Games, finishing fourth at 13.07, after running a qualifying time of 12.99.

Media coverage 
In July 2012, videos of Jenneke dancing during her pre-race warmup before the 100 m hurdles race at the 2012 World Junior Championships in Athletics in Barcelona went viral on YouTube. One clip received 19 million views by the following week and was featured on the American late-night talk show, The Tonight Show.

Jenneke acted in a short comedic video produced by the website The Chive titled Forever Alone Meets Michelle Jenneke, playing herself in a piece referencing her viral video. The video had received over 10 million views on YouTube by 2014.

In January 2013, Jenneke was ranked tenth on AskMen.com's 99 Most Desirable Women 2013. She was featured in the 2013 Sports Illustrated Swimsuit Issue.

In 2014, Jenneke was featured in a video-heavy mobile computing app on stretching techniques called Stretch with Michelle Jenneke. Early the same year, she was a star in the Top Gear Sydney Festival, racing a Nissan GT-R.

Athletic achievements

Other career highlights 
 1st place (100 m hurdles) – 2016 Australian National Championships (Olympic qualifying time, 12.93)
 1st place (100 m hurdles) – 2010 Australian Junior Championships
 1st place (4 × 100 m relay) – 2010 Australian Junior Championships (national record)
 4th place ("Swedish medley" relay) – 2010 Summer Youth Olympics, Singapore
 3rd place (100 m hurdles) – 2011 Australian Championships
 2nd place (100 m hurdles) – 2015 Australian Championships (12.82)
 Semi Finals – 6th place (100 m hurdles) - 2015 World Championships Beijing (13.01) (fastest reaction time, 0.122, in all semi-finals)
 Semi Finals – 10th place (60 m hurdles) - 2016 IAAF World Indoor Championships, Portland, USA (8.10, personal best)
 Heats – 6th in heat (100 m hurdles) - 2016 Olympic Games, Rio de Janeiro, Brazil (13.26)
 Semi Final - 7th in semi (100 m hurdles) - 2017 World Championships, London (13.250)

References

External links 

 
 Michelle Jenneke Interview
 Michelle Jenneke athletics profile
 
 
 
 
 

1993 births
Living people
Australian female hurdlers
Athletes from Sydney
Models from Sydney
Australian female models
Athletes (track and field) at the 2010 Summer Youth Olympics
Australian people of German descent
People educated at The Hills Grammar School
Commonwealth Games competitors for Australia
Athletes (track and field) at the 2014 Commonwealth Games
Athletes (track and field) at the 2018 Commonwealth Games
World Athletics Championships athletes for Australia
Athletes (track and field) at the 2016 Summer Olympics
Olympic athletes of Australia
Universiade medalists in athletics (track and field)
Universiade bronze medalists for Australia
Competitors at the 2015 Summer Universiade
Competitors at the 2017 Summer Universiade